Gerald C. Calliste Jr. (born November 26, 1965), also known as Hashim, is an American entrepreneur, producer, songwriter, publisher, and former DJ who is best known for the hip hop, electro, and dance music song "Al-Naafiysh (The Soul)" (1983).

Overview 
In 1983, Calliste Jr. co-founded New York Independent record label Cutting Records Inc. with two partners and recorded under the name Hashim. Calliste Jr., 16, used a $50 Casio keyboard (combo calculator) to teach himself how to play keyboards by ear. One year later he went on to write and produce Al-Naafiysh (The Soul) "one of the greatest Electro tracks ever" that during the early 1980s "made it to #43 in the Billboards Dance Disco Charts" and to this day "parts of Al-Naafiysh (The Soul) have been sampled over and over again."

In 2008, Hashim appeared on various artists music compilations licensed by Global Underground Ltd, Ministry of Sound with recording artists Deep Dish, Frankie Knuckles, Jamiroquai, Kosheen, Cheryl Lynn, Run DMC, Basement Jaxx, Young MC, Herbie Hancock and more. The compilations are mixed. by such DJs as Junior Sanchez, Danny Tenaglia, David Morales, Hex Hector, Satoshi Tomiie and Benny Benassi. In 2009 Hashim appeared on various artists music compilations licensed by Universal Music and Ninja Tune with recording artists Gwen Guthrie, New Order, Frankie Goes to Hollywood and others. On Ninja Tune's "Now, Look and Listen", Hashim's music is featured with Missy Elliott, Afrika Bambaataa, Eric B. & Rakim, The Prodigy, Grace Jones, Human League, Timbaland and Magoo and Common featuring Pharrell Williams.

Also in 2009, Hashim appeared on Activision Blizzard's popular video game DJ Hero: Renegade Edition with Daft Punk, 50 Cent, Jay-Z, Eminem, Beastie Boys, Gwen Stefani, Darude, Grandmaster Flash, Issac Hayes, Marvin Gaye, DJ Shadow, David Bowie and many more. On DJ Hero: Renegade Edition Hashim is pitted against Daft Punk on the Expert difficulty level. In 2003 he appears on Sony Computer Entertainment of America's NBA ShootOut 2004 and in 2002 Hashim appears on Grand Theft Auto: Vice City on the game track, soundtrack and TV commercial.

In 2010 and 2011 respectively Hashim's Al-Naafiysh (The Soul) appears on Catch The Beat: The Best of Soul Underground mixed by Jay Strongman (Warehouse Mix/ UK) and three DMC World Champions DJ Qbert, DJ Shiftee and DJ Rafik triple team Hashim's old school Electro Hip Hop classic song Al-Naafiysh (The Soul) or as DJ say "It's Time" on Germany's Native Instruments new DJ Qbert's Breakfast of Champions Traktor Pro 2 DJ Gear commercial and software.

In October 2009 Calliste Jr. is co-founder and partner of technology startup venture, Simplestream.us (now Simplestreamtech.com) an infrastructure-as-a-service (IaaS) cloud and will soon launch Bassmintmusic.tv a new independent music video service. Simplestream.us offers MediaDesign a digital media management system, software-as-a-service cloud to media producers and primarily in the film and music business.

Career 

At 16, Calliste Jr. used a $50 Casio keyboard (combo calculator) to teach himself how to play keyboard by ear. After self-producing Al-Naafiysh, Calliste Jr. got his big break at Tommy Boy Records when a DJ by the name of Harold McGuire (professionally known as Whiz Kid) introduced Calliste Jr. to then Tommy Boy Records Vice President Monica Lynch.

According to Kellman, 2007, "Hashim was the work of Jerry Calliste Jr. He became involved with music as a teenager; he was DJing at the age of 12, and in the early '80s, while still a teenager, he promoted parties. His graffiti work on a banner for Tommy Boy Records (and DJ Whiz Kid) helped him attain a part-time gig doing custodial work at that label's offices." Having been raised a Catholic, he converted to Islam in 1982 and adopted Hashim, which means "Decisive" in Arabic, as his Muslim name. In 1983, Calliste Jr. became Cutting Records first recording artists and the company's vice president. ""Al-Naafiysh (The Soul)" became Cutting's first release in November 1983, and Calliste became the label's vice president."

"Calliste eventually left Cutting and continued working as a promoter. He also went on to start Bassmint Music, an online label and shop based in Ohio." Calliste Jr. is currently the owner of Hashim Music a music publishing company and long-time member of the American Society of Composers, Authors and Publishers (ASCAP). Since 2001, Calliste Jr. is president and CEO of both Bassmint Music and Caldella Music an online independent record label and music publishing company respectively.

Calliste Jr. also attends the Ross School of Management & Leadership at Franklin University where he is a double major student studying for a Bachelor of Science in Information Technology and Bachelor of Science in Management Information Sciences.

In 2009 Calliste Jr. is co-founder and partner of Columbus, Ohio-based startup, a public infrastructure-as-a-service (IaaS) cloud Simplestreamhd.com now Simplestreamtech.com  and will soon launch Bassmintmusic.tv a new independent music video service. According to CIO-Today.com 2010, "In October 2009 Simplestreamhd.com soft launched and allowed selected companies, tech writers, bloggers and potential clients to demo the system." "To boot his (Calliste Jr.'s) other startup venture Bassmintmusic.tv...a new independent music video service is powered by MediaDesign and Simplestreamtech.com." Simplestreamtech.com offers MediaDesign through a software-as-a-service (SaaS) model for entrepreneurs, small businesses and corporate (enterprise) clients.

Discography 

"Al-Naafiysh (The Soul)" (Cutting, 1983)
"We're Rocking the Planet" (Cutting, 1984)
"Primrose Path" (Cutting, 1986)
"UK Fresh 86' (The Anthem)" (featuring MC Devon) (Streetwave (U.K.), 1986)
"I Don't Need Your Love" (featuring Jai Sims) (Precise, 1987)

Copyrights 
 Calliste Jr., G. (1983). Al-Naafiysh (The Soul). Retrieved September 6, 2007, from U.S. Copyright Office Public Catalog database.
 Calliste Jr., G. (1985). We're Rockin The Planet. Retrieved September 6, 2007, from U.S. Copyright Office Public Catalog database.
 Calliste Jr., G., Taylor, D. (1985). Crime of Passion/Dub of Passion. Retrieved September 6, 2007, from U.S. Copyright Office Public Catalog database.
 Calliste Jr., J., Caldwell, D. (1986). U.K. Fresh '86 The Anthem. Retrieved September 6, 2007, from U.S. Copyright Office Public Catalog database.
 Calliste Jr., G. (1986). Primrose Path. Retrieved September 6, 2007, from U.S. Copyright Office Public Catalog database.
 Calliste Jr., G. (1987). Chateau Vie (Castle Life). Retrieved September 6, 2007, from U.S. Copyright Office Public Catalog database.
 Calliste Jr., G., Gilliam, O. (1987). I Don't Need Your Love. Retrieved September 6, 2007, from U.S. Copyright Office Public Catalog database.

References 

  DJ Qbert, DJ Shiftee, DJ Rafik. Qbert's Breakfast of Champions. Traktor Pro 2. Native Instruments. Retrieved on April 4, 2011, from 
  Jay Strongman (2010). Warehouse Mix. Catch the Beat: The Best of Soul Underground. Retrieved on April 4, 2011, from 
  CIOToday.com. (2010c). "New Digital Media Solution Cloud Unveiled". Retrieved on December 14, 2010, from 
  CIOToday.com. (2010b). "New Digital Media Solution Cloud Unveiled". Retrieved on December 14, 2010, from 
  CIOToday.com. (2010). "New Digital Media Solution Cloud Unveiled". Retrieved on December 14, 2010, from 
  Various – Afterhours Ibiza Unmixed DJ Friendly Version. (2008). Global Underground Ltd.  Retrieved on May 18, 2010, from 
  Various – Global Underground Afterhours Ibiza 2. (2008). Global Underground Ltd. Retrieved on May 18, 2010, from 
  Various – Renaissance Anthems. (2008). Ministry of Sound. Retrieved on May 18, 2010, from 
  Various – Ultimate Streetdance. (2008). Ministry of Sound. Retrieved on May 18, 2010, from, 
  Various – 12"/80s ElectroPop. (2009). Universal Music. Retrieved on May 18, 2010, from 
  Various – DJ Food & DK (3). (2009). Now, Look and Listen. Ninja Tune. Retrieved on May 18, 2010, from 
  DJ Hero: Renegade Edition. Difficulty Expert. Activision Blizzard Retrieved May 18, 2010, from 
  DJ Hero: Renegade Edition. Artists Listing. Activision Blizzard. Retrieved May 18, 2010, from 
  Grand Theft Auto: Vice City. 2004. Rockstar Games. Retrieved May 18. 2010, from 
  Bogdanov, V. (n.d.). All Music Guide to Hip Hop – The Definitive Guide to Rap & Hip Hop. Hashim Jerry Calliste Jr. profile. Milwaukee: BackBeat Books. Retrieved September 5, 2007, from 
  Electro Empire. (2000). Hashim interview. ElectroEmpire Articles. Retrieved on September 5, 2007, from  
  Electro Empire. (2003). Hashim profile. Retrieved September 5, 2007, from 
  Fresh, F. (2004). Freddy Fresh presents The Rap Records 1st Edition – The Ultimate Vinyl Resource Book. Minnesota: Nearby Publishing LLC.
  Gayagoy, G. (2000, October). The Single Life. Columbus Monthly. CM Media Inc. p. 40
  Hashim Music. (n.d.). ASCAP. Retrieved September 6, 2007, from ASCAP ACE Title Search database.
  Kellman, A. (2007). Hashim Biography. All Media Guide. Retrieved September 5, 2007, from []
  Kellman, A. (2007b). Hashim Biography. All Media Guide. Retrieved September 5, 2007, from []
  Kellman, A. (2007c). Hashim Biography. All Media Guide. Retrieved September 5, 2007, from []
  Kugel, W. (2005). Find new music in Bassmint. The Lantern. Ohio State University school newspaper The Lantern, Retrieved September 5, (2007), from 
  Kugel, W. (2005b). Find new music in Bassmint. The Lantern. Ohio State University school newspaper The Lantern, Retrieved September 5, (2007), from 
  Sony Music Entertainment Inc., (2004). Grand Theft Auto: Vice City OST Volume 5: Wildstyle Pirate Radio. USA: Sony Music Entertainment Inc.
  Stanley, L. (2006). Apple's iPod dominates the MP3 Scene. Bowling Green University school newspaper. Retrieved September 5, (2007), from 
  Universal Music TV, (2004). The Definitive Electro and Hip Hip Collection. Retrieved September 5, 2007, from 
  University of Miami School of Communication. (2006). Public Relations|Bassmint Music Inc.. Retrieved September 5, 2007, from

External links 
 Jerry Calliste Jr. Official web site
 Calliste Communications
 The Official Hashim
 Hashim Music
 Simplestreamtech.com Media made easy
 
 Discogs.com songwriting discography
 Wikipedia Grand Theft Auto: Vice City soundtrack
 
 NBA Shootout 2004 video game credits listing

1965 births
Living people
People from the Bronx
American electro musicians
Tommy Boy Records artists